William W. Hood III (born 1963) is an associate justice of the Supreme Court of Colorado, having served in this position since 2014.

Hood received a Bachelor of Arts in International Relations, magna cum laude from Syracuse University in 1985, and a Juris Doctor from the University of Virginia School of Law, where he was a member of the Virginia Law Review. Hood was in private practice with the law firm of Isaacson Rosenbaum, and was later a prosecutor with the 18th Judicial District Attorney's office for ten years, before becoming a Denver District Court judge in 2007.

On October 25, 2013, Governor John Hickenlooper appointed Hood to the supreme court. Hood was reelected to a ten-year term in 2016.

References

Justices of the Colorado Supreme Court
Syracuse University alumni
University of Virginia School of Law alumni
1963 births
Living people
Place of birth missing (living people)
21st-century American judges